The NOS Primavera Sound 2017 was held on 8 to 10 June 2017 at the Parque da Cidade, Porto, Portugal. The festival was headlined by Bon Iver, Aphex Twin and Justice.

Lineup
Headline performers are listed in boldface. Artists listed from latest to earliest set times.

NOS

{{hidden
| headercss = color:#ffffff; background: #1a76a0; font-size: 100%; width: 100%;;
| contentcss = text-align: left; font-size: 100%; width: 100%;;
| header = Bon Iver set list
| content =

"22 (OVER S∞∞N)"
"10 d E A T h b R E a s T ⚄ ⚄"
"715 - CREEKS"
"33 “GOD”"
"29 #Strafford APTS"
"666 ʇ"
"21 M♢♢N WATER"
"Perth"
"Minnesota, WI"
"Beach Baby"
"Towers"
"8 (circle)"
"45_"
"Holocene"
"Calgary"
"Creature Fear"

Encore
"Skinny Love"
}}

Super Bock

Palco

Pitchfork

References

Primavera Sound
2017 music festivals
Music festivals in Portugal